The 1932–33 Detroit Red Wings season was the first season under the newly named Detroit Red Wings name, seventh of the franchise. The Red Wings qualified for the playoffs and defeated the Montreal Maroons before losing to the New York Rangers in the playoff semi-finals.

Offseason

Regular season

Final standings

Record vs. opponents

Schedule and results

Playoffs

(C2) Montreal Maroons vs. (A2) Detroit Red Wings

Detroit wins a total goal series 5 goals to 2.

(A2) Detroit Red Wings vs. (A3) New York Rangers

New York R. wins a total goal series 6 goals to 3.

Player statistics

Regular season
Scoring

Goaltending

Playoffs
Scoring

Goaltending

Note: Pos = Position; GP = Games played; G = Goals; A = Assists; Pts = Points; PIM = Penalty minutes; PPG = Power-play goals; SHG = Short-handed goals; GWG = Game-winning goals
      MIN = Minutes played; W = Wins; L = Losses; T = Ties; GA = Goals-against; GAA = Goals-against average; SO = Shutouts;

Awards and records

Transactions

See also
1932–33 NHL season

References

Bibliography
 

Detroit Red Wings seasons
Detroit
Detroit
Detroit Red Wings
Detroit Red Wings